Luanne Shirley Koskinen (born 1940) is an American politician in the state of Minnesota. She served in the Minnesota House of Representatives.

References

Women state legislators in Minnesota
Democratic Party members of the Minnesota House of Representatives
1940 births
Living people
21st-century American women